Diana Andreyevna Klimova (born 8 October 1996) is a Russian road and track cyclist, who currently rides for UCI Women's Continental Team . Representing Russia at international competitions, Klimova won the bronze medal at the 2016–17 UCI Track Cycling World Cup, Round 1 in Glasgow in the madison.

Major results
Sources:

2017
 Grand Prix of Tula
1st Points Race
2nd Omnium
 2nd Madison, Grand Prix Minsk (with Maria Petukhova)
 2nd Madison, Grand Prix of Moscow (with Maria Petukhova)
2018
 International Belgian Track Meeting
3rd Omnium
3rd Scratch Race
 4th Gran Premio della Liberazione
 10th Overall Giro della Toscana Int. Femminile – Memorial Michela Fanini
2019
 4th Overall Giro delle Marche in Rosa
 6th Overall Tour of Thailand
 10th Grand Prix Alanya
2020
 1st  Road race, National Road Championships
 1st Grand Prix Alanya
 7th Grand Prix Gazipaşa
2022
 2nd Grand Prix Velo Manavgat

References

External links

1996 births
Living people
Russian female cyclists
Russian track cyclists
Place of birth missing (living people)
Cyclists at the 2019 European Games
European Games medalists in cycling
European Games bronze medalists for Russia
21st-century Russian women